Ordinary Days is a Canadian dramatic thriller film released in 2017. Directed by Kris Booth, Renuka Jeyapalan and Jordan Canning, the film centres on the mysterious disappearance of Cara Cook (Jacqueline Byers), telling the story from three different perspectives.

Canning directs the first segment, which centres on Cara's parents Rich (Richard Clarkin) and Marie (Torri Higginson); Booth directs the second segment centring on Jonathan Brightbill (Michael Xavier), the police officer investigating Cara's disappearance; Jeyapalan directs the third, which reveals the story from Cara's own perspective. The cast also includes Joris Jarsky, Jefferson Brown and Daniel Kash.

The film was written and produced by Ramona Barckert, and commenced production in October 2016. It premiered in September 2017 at the Atlantic Film Festival

References

External links 
 

2017 films
Canadian thriller drama films
English-language Canadian films
Films directed by Jordan Canning
Films directed by Renuka Jeyapalan
2010s English-language films
2010s Canadian films
2017 thriller drama films